The Tahiti women's national football team or Vahine Ura represents French Polynesia in international women's football. The team is controlled by the Fédération Tahitienne de Football.

Results and fixtures

The following is a list of match results in the last 12 months, as well as any future matches that have been scheduled.

Legend

2022

Current squad
The following players were called up for the 2022 OFC Women's Nations Cup from 13 to 30 July in Suva, Fiji.

Caps and goals updated as of 12 July 2022, before the game against Papua New Guinea.

2019 squad
The following players were called up for the 2019 Pacific Games from 7–20 July in Apia, Samoa.

Caps and goals updated as of 18 July 2019, after the game against Vanuatu.

Recent call-ups
The following players have been called up for the team in the last 12 months.

Competitive record

OFC Women's Nations Cup

*Draws include knockout matches decided on penalty kicks.

Pacific Games

See also

Sport in Tahiti
Football in Tahiti
Women's football in Tahiti
Tahiti men's national football team

References

 
Oceanian women's national association football teams
National football teams of Overseas France